As an academic discipline the study of politics in education has two main roots:  The first root is based on theories from political science while the second root is footed in organizational theory.    Political science attempts to explain how societies and social organizations use power to establish regulations and allocate resources.  Organizational theory uses scientific theories of management to develop deeper understandings regarding the function of organizations.

Researchers have drawn a distinction between two types of politics in schools.  The term micro-politics refers to the use of formal and informal power by individuals and groups to achieve their goals in organizations. Cooperative and conflictive processes are integral components of micro-politics. Macro-politics refers to how power is used and decision making is conducted at district, state, and federal levels.  Macro-politics is generally considered to exist outside the school, but researchers have noted that micro- and macro-politics may exist at any level of school systems depending on circumstance.

There exist significant difference between "Politics of Education" and "Politics in Education". More debates on the prevailing differences are solicited from academia of the world to define politics educationally.

References

Further reading

 

Academic disciplines
Education policy